The Anti-Gravity Room was a weekly Canadian television program of the mid-late 1990s, spotlighting comic books and video games, and hosted by Nick Scoullar and Phil Guerrero. It was produced by YTV in Canada, and was carried in the United States on the Sci-Fi Channel. It featured interviews with international comic creators, coverage of comic events, reviews of video games, and guest hosts such as Ben Stiller and Kevin Smith.

History
Nick started his first show, TALKCOMICS, in 1993 with his best friend Milan Dale.  It was a call-in show which aired on the public-access television station Manhattan Neighborhood Network(MNN). Viewers would call in with questions on comic books and host Nick Scoullar would answer them.

Word of the show got around and it was jointly picked up by Canada's YTV, America's Fremantle Corporation and Sci-Fi channel, and turned into The Anti-Gravity Room. The show was expanded into more of a news/information show that still covered comics, but also more literature, games, movies and music. Two more hosts were added: Phil Guerrero and Shashi Bhatia. Nick was based in New York City, Phil in Toronto and Shashi in Los Angeles.

Shashi would later be replaced by Jaimy Mahlon over the course of the series' four-year run.

The final season of The Anti-Gravity Room was only aired in Canada, as the Sci-Fi Channel decided to cancel the series early. The new season had the show's titled renamed to Warp.

References

External links
The Anti-Gravity Room - Sci-Fi (archived)
The Anti-Gravity Room - YTV (archived)

Interview Transcript
THE ANTI GRAVITY ROOM'S NICK AMADEUS LIVE INTERVIEW! YOU ME YTV!

1990s Canadian children's television series
1995 Canadian  television series debuts
1997 Canadian  television series endings
YTV (Canadian TV channel) original programming
Television series by Corus Entertainment
Television shows filmed in Los Angeles
Television shows filmed in New York City
Television shows filmed in Toronto